Pig's Bay is a coastal area in East Shoebury, a small beachland area in the suburb of Shoeburyness in the City of Southend-on-Sea, in the ceremonial county of Essex, England. The main entrance to the site is at Blackgate Road, Shoeburyness.  This is also the gateway to the island of Foulness, the fourth largest island off the coast of England.

The bay is the site of MoD Shoeburyness, a military installation established in 1849 and which is still used as a firing range.

One of the other uses of the site is the storage and scrapping of old railway vehicles. It has its own private railway network, stretching for around six miles, linked to one of the sidings at Network Rail's Shoeburyness c2c electrical multiple unit depot by means of two unmanned level crossings across Shoeburyness High Street and Blackgate Road, respectively.

The site has also featured in a few episodes of the Channel 4 series Scrapheap Challenge. The front locomotive of the passenger train involved in the 1997 Southall rail crash – when an InterCity 125 train collided with a freight train, killing seven people – was scrapped here, being cut up by Serco three years after the incident once the inquiry had been completed.

References

Southend-on-Sea (district)
Coastal environment of Essex
Buildings and structures in Southend-on-Sea